Marco Lopez could refer to: 

Marco Lopez (actor) (born 1935), American actor, known for portraying a character named "Marco Lopez" on the television series Emergency!
Marco A. López Jr. (born 1978), American government official, former mayor of Nogales, Arizona
Marco Antonio López (born 1987), Mexican professional boxer

See also
Mark Lopez (disambiguation)
Marcos López (born 1999), Peruvian footballer